The River Trothy is a river which flows through north Monmouthshire, in rural south east Wales.

The river rises on Campston Hill, northeast of Abergavenny. It flows southwards until Llanvapley, where it turns east.

See also
List of rivers of Wales

External links

Monmouth, Wales
Trothy
1Trothy